Robert A. Blust (May 9, 1940 – January 5, 2022) was an American linguist who worked in several areas, including historical linguistics, lexicography and ethnology. He was Professor of Linguistics at the University of Hawaii at Mānoa. Blust specialized in the Austronesian languages and made major contributions to the field of Austronesian linguistics.

Early life and career
Blust was born in Cincinnati, Ohio on May 9, 1940, and raised in California. He received both a Bachelor of Arts in anthropology in 1967 and a PhD in linguistics in 1974 from the University of Hawaii at Mānoa. He taught at Leiden University in The Netherlands from 1976 to 1984, after which he returned to the Department of Linguistics at Mānoa for the rest of his career, serving as department chair from 2005 to 2008. He was a Fellow of the Linguistic Society of America.

Austronesian languages
Until 2018, he served as the review editor for Oceanic Linguistics, an academic journal that covers the Austronesian languages. Blust is best known for his work on this large language family, including the comprehensive Austronesian Comparative Dictionary (1995) and a Thao-English dictionary (2003). Another one of his well-known works is a 2009 work called The Austronesian Languages, which is the first single-authored book to cover all aspects (phonology, syntax, morphology, sound changes, classification, etc.) of the Austronesian language family in its entirety.

Field work
As part of his field work, Blust studied 97 Austronesian languages spoken in locations such as Sarawak, Papua New Guinea, and Taiwan. In Taiwan, he performed field work on Formosan languages such as Thao, Kavalan, Pazeh, Amis, Paiwan and Saisiyat. His dictionary of the highly-endangered Thao language, at over 1100 pages, is one of the most complete ever compiled for a Formosan language. Blust also had an abiding research interest in both linguistic and cultural aspects of rainbows and dragons.

Personal life and death
Blust died in Honolulu, Hawaii, on January 5, 2022, at the age of 81, after a 13-year battle with cancer.

See also
 Austronesian Hypothesis

Selected publications

References

External links
Austronesian Comparative Dictionary (ACD) by Robert Blust and Stephen Trussel (web edition)

1940 births
2022 deaths
American lexicographers
Linguists from the United States
Historical linguists
University of Hawaiʻi at Mānoa alumni
University of Hawaiʻi at Mānoa faculty
Linguists of Austronesian languages
Paleolinguists
Writers from Cincinnati
Fellows of the Linguistic Society of America